La Renaissance can also refer to:

 La Renaissance (barge) - a canal barge
 La Renaissance - national anthem of the Central African Republic
 Renaissance (disambiguation)